Puck pinnata, the mischievous dreamer, is a species of anglerfish in the family Oneirodidae known only from the northwest Pacific Ocean.  As with all other species in the family, it is a pelagic, deep-water fish that is a member of the abyssal ecosystem. It is the only known species in the genus Puck.

References
 

Oneirodidae
Taxa named by Theodore Wells Pietsch III
Fish described in 1978